Pechlaurier Lock is a double-chamber lock on the Canal du Midi in the Aude region of Languedoc, France. The adjacent locks are Argens Lock  to the east and Ognon Lock  to the west.

See also
Locks on the Canal du Midi

Locks on the Canal du Midi